Great American Novel is the concept of a novel that perfectly represents the spirit of the age in the United States at the time of its publication.

Great American Novel may also refer to:

Books that use this title 
The Great American Novel (1923) by William Carlos Williams
The Great American Novel (1938) by Clyde Brion Davis
The Great American Novel (1973) by Philip Roth
The Great American Novel (2000) by Keith Malley

Other titles 
The Great American Novel (1972), a song by Larry Norman on the album Only Visiting This Planet